Sooner Mall is a regional shopping mall and trade area located in Norman, Oklahoma. It contains four major department store anchors, and a total of 73 tenants comprising a total of approximately 512,000 square feet of gross leasable area. It is also the top employer of University of Oklahoma students. The anchor stores are JCPenney and Dillard's. There is one vacant anchor store that was once Sears. Junior anchors are Get Air Trampoline Park, Sun & Ski Sports, and JoAnn Fabrics.

The mall was built in 1976 as Sooner Fashion Mall. It was expanded in 1988 when Dillard's moved to a new store. JCPenney, which already had a store in the mall, moved into Dillard's original location.

In 2015, Sears Holdings spun off 235 of its properties, including the Sears at Sooner Mall, into Seritage Growth Properties.

On October 15, 2018, it was announced that Sears would be closing as part of a plan to close 142 stores nationwide.

Anchors
Dillard's 
JCPenney  
Old Navy

References

External links
Sooner Mall home page

Shopping malls established in 1976
1976 establishments in Oklahoma
Brookfield Properties
Shopping malls in Oklahoma
Buildings and structures in Norman, Oklahoma